Caroline Catherine Müller (born 31 July 1964), known professionally as C. C. Catch, is a Dutch-born German pop singer, also known for her collaboration with Dieter Bohlen (one half of Modern Talking) in the 1980s.

Early life

C. C. Catch was born in the Netherlands to German parents and moved to Germany in the late 1970s with her family. She was supported by her parents from an early age, when they recognised her talent and encouraged her wish to be a famous singer. Her father was especially supportive and played a very important role in her successful career as her manager and tour-manager.

From an early age, the up-and-coming singer took part in talent contests and was originally a member of the German girl quartet Optimal, which consisted of four female members.

Musical career

Müller was discovered by Dieter Bohlen in one of her performances in Hamburg. Bohlen signed her to BMG, effectively launching her solo career. Bohlen gave her the stage name C. C. Catch, the two "C"s standing for the first initials of her two first names, and "Catch" which she thought was a good idea and looked great with the initials.

In the summer of 1985, Catch released her debut single "I Can Lose My Heart Tonight". The single entered the top 20 in some European countries, including Germany and Switzerland.

Bohlen and Catch worked together until 1989, during which time twelve singles and four albums were released. Eight of those singles entered the top 20, whereas one of the albums entered the top 10. Catch wanted to bring more personal input to her songs, but Bohlen refused. As a result, in 1989, she parted ways with him and BMG. However, it took some court hearings for her to win the rights to her stage name.

On a New Year's Eve television show in Spain, Catch met Simon Napier-Bell (former manager of Wham!'s George Michael). Shortly thereafter, Napier-Bell became her manager and signed her to Polygram subsidiary Metronome. Her first (and only) album on the label, Hear What I Say, was released at the end of 1989 and was Catch's last album to date. It was produced by Andy Taylor (ex-Duran Duran), Dave Clayton (who has worked with George Michael and U2), and Jo Dworniak. Seven of the songs were co-written by her, in which Catch was able to collaborate more. It sold more than her previous two albums, Big Fun and Diamonds, demonstrating her abilities as an artist working on her own terms.

From this album, "Big Time" was released as a single in 1989, and peaked at No. 26 in Germany. During this time, BMG also released the single "Baby I Need Your Love", along with the compilation Classics.

Hiatus
Afterwards, C. C. Catch parted with Metronome on good terms to take time out from the music industry. During this time, she focused on her spiritual growth, practicing yoga and a form of meditation; she also started writing her own songs.

At the beginning of the 1990s, C. C. Catch worked on a project by Peter Gabriel from which the song "Harmonix" emerged. It appeared on Jam Nation's 1993 album "Way Down Below Buffalo Hell". In 1998, she returned to Germany, released the single "Megamix '98" and appeared on the BBC music television program Top of the Pops with rapper Krayzee.

In 2003, her single "Shake Your Head" reached the top 12 sales charts in Spain in 2003 and developed into a summer hit in southern Europe. In 2004, Catch took part in the ProSieben show Comeback - Die Big Chance. From this show emerged the single "Survivor" and the album Comeback United, on which the participating artists such as C. C. Catch, Limahl, Chris Norman, Benjamin Boyce, Coolio, Jazzy von Tic Tac Toe, Haddaway, Emilia and the Weather Girls contributed various songs. In the same year, she appeared on the US tour of pop duo Modern Talking.

In September 2010, the single "Unborn Love" was released, a collaboration with Spanish music producer Juan Martinez.

In 2015, Catch toured the United States, including Los Angeles, Dallas and Chicago, followed by the first major concert in Toronto, Canada in 2016, followed by a concert tour of South America in 2017 (Argentina, Peru, Chile, Brazil, Bolivia).

Discography

Studio albums

Compilation albums

Singles

References

External links 

 CC Catch Official UK site
 Official German site
 
 CCCatch Official Spanish Fanclub
 C.C.Catch at MusicMoz
 
 

1964 births
Living people
English-language singers from Germany
Eurodisco musicians
People from Oss
Dutch women singers
Dutch people of German descent
German women pop singers
Hansa Records artists